Del Rio is a city and the county seat of Val Verde County in southwestern Texas, United States. The city is 152 miles west of San Antonio. As of 2020, Del Rio had a population of 34,673.

History
The Spanish established a small settlement south of the Rio Grande in present-day Mexico, and some Spaniards settled on what became the United States side of the Rio Grande as early as the 18th century. Paula Losoya Taylor built the first hacienda in the area in 1862. U.S. development on the north shore of the Rio Grande did not begin until after the American Civil War.

Developers acquired several thousand acres of land adjacent to the springs, and to San Felipe Creek formed by the springs, from the state of Texas in exchange for building a canal system to irrigate the area. The developers sold tracts of land surrounding the canals to recover their investment and show a profit. The initial investors (William C. Adams, Joseph M. Hudson, John P. Grove, Donald Jackson, John Perry, Joseph Ney, Randolph Pafford, A. O. Strickland, and James H Taylor) formed the San Felipe Agricultural, Manufacturing, and Irrigation Company in 1868. The organization completed construction of a network of irrigation canals in 1871. Residents referred to the slowly developing town as San Felipe Del Rio because local lore said the name came from early Spanish explorers who offered a mass at the site on St. Philip's Day, 1635.

In 1883, local residents requested a post office be established. The United States Postal Department shortened "San Felipe del Rio" to "Del Rio" to avoid confusion with San Felipe de Austin. In 1885, Val Verde County was organized and Del Rio became the county seat. The City of Del Rio was incorporated on November 15, 1911.

The San Felipe community was started by the Arteaga family. Arteaga Street and Arteaga Park are named after them.

Many historical artifacts from Del Rio, particularly from the 19th century, are preserved at the Whitehead Memorial Museum downtown.

During September 2021, as part of the ongoing Mexico–United States border crisis, approximately 30,000 Haitians migrants illegally entered the United States at Del Rio. The United States Border Patrol moved many into a camp underneath the Del Río–Ciudad Acuña International Bridge. The squalid conditions in the camp attracted widespread national attention. A photo of a Haitian grabbing the reins of a horse-mounted Border Patrol agent was incorrectly alleged to show the agent whipping the Haitian.

Geography

Del Rio lies on the northwestern edges of the Tamaulipan mezquital, also called the South Texas brush country. It is also near the southwestern corner of the Edwards Plateau, which is the western fringe of the famous, oak savanna-covered Texas Hill Country; that area is dotted with numerous small springs; one of these is the San Felipe Springs, which provides a constant flow of water to San Felipe Creek. The creek supplied fresh water for drinking and irrigation to early settlers of Del Rio, and the springs are still the town's water supply.

The Del Rio region, west to about the Pecos River, has a mix of desert shrub and steppe vegetation, depending on soil type, with the gray-leafed cenizo (Leucophyllum spp.), several different acacias, cactuses, and grama grasses dominant members of local flora. The terrain is mostly level, but some areas are dissected with substantial canyons and drainages, though none of the upland areas is high or large enough to be considered a mountain.

Climate
Del Rio experiences a hot semi-arid climate (Köppen BSh) with mild winters and hot summers. During the spring season, as well occasionally during the fall season, severe thunderstorms often build on the Serranías del Burro to the distant west of Del Rio. This is believed to occur due to the uplift of moisture from the Gulf of Mexico which is channeled along the Rio Grande.

Demographics

2020 census

As of the 2020 United States census, there were 34,673 people, 12,300 households, and 8,898 families residing in the city.

2000 census
As of the census of 2000, 33,867 people, 10,778 households, and 8,514 families resided in the city. The population density was 2,194.0 people per square mile (846.9/km). The 11,895 housing units averaged a density of 770.6 per square mile (297.5/km). The racial makeup of the city was 73.05% White American, 7.21% African American, 0.70% Native American, 0.49% Asian, 0.06% Pacific Islander, 17.79% from other races, and 2.68% from two or more races. Hispanics or Latinos of any race were 81.04% of the population.

Of the 10,778 households, 42.0% had children under the age of 18 living with them, 59.3% were married couples living together, 15.8% had a female householder with no husband present, and 21.0% were not families. About 18.7% of all households were made up of individuals, and 8.4% had someone living alone who was 65 years of age or older. The average household size was 3.09 and the average family size was 3.56.

In the city, the population was distributed as 31.7% under the age of 18, 8.8% from 18 to 24, 27.6% from 25 to 44, 20.2% from 45 to 64, and 11.7% who were 65 years of age or older. The median age was 32 years. For every 100 females, there were 94.0 males. For every 100 females age 18 and over, there were 89.6 males.

The median income for a household in the city was $27,387, and for a family was $30,788. Males had a median income of $27,255 versus $17,460 for females. The per capita income for the city was $12,199. About 22.9% of families and 27.0% of the population were below the poverty line, including 35.8% of those under age 18 and 26.4% of those age 65 or over.

Micropolitan area

Del Rio is the principal city of the Del Rio micropolitan statistical area, which includes all of Val Verde County; the micropolitan area had an estimated population over 50,000 in 2007. Located across from Del Rio, in the Mexican state of Coahuila, is the city of Ciudad Acuña, with a city population of 201,161.

Economy

Laughlin Air Force Base
As the Cold War pressures built, along with new border-control issues, Laughlin Field was rebuilt and renamed Laughlin Air Force Base and was again used as a home for flight training. Laughlin plays a large part in the Del Rio community as the area's largest employer.

Val Verde Correctional Facility
The GEO Group, a private correctional facility corporation based in Boca Raton, Florida, manages the Val Verde Correctional Facility in Del Rio. It has a contract to house offenders for the county, for the U.S. Marshals Service (male/female) prisoners, and U.S. Customs and Border Protection detainees. The facility opened in 2001 with 688 beds. In 2007, the facility was expanded to its current capacity of 1,400 beds. It is one of the major employers in the Del Rio area and meets standards required by state and federal guidelines.

Arts and culture
Some of the earliest surviving cultural artefacts in the region are various pictographs found in local caverns in and near the town. Some of these pictographs date as far back as 4,200 years when the Seminole first reached the region and created pictographs in the caverns of the Lower Pecos Canyonlands Archeological District, a proposed National Historic Landmark. The pictographs are preserved in part by the Shumla Archaeological Research and Education Center, a local group which documents the pictographs, and creates educational material about them.

The Whitehead Memorial Museum carries on the history of the culture created in Del Rio brought by mementos of Judge Roy Bean.

The Laughlin Heritage Museum Foundation educates the public about the importance of air power in sustaining the national security of the United States, and to preserve the heritage of Laughlin Air Force Base, Texas.

Del Rio is home to the oldest continuously running winery in Texas, the Val Verde Winery. The winery was established in 1883 by Italian immigrant Frank Qualia, who brought with him the family tradition of winemaking. Today, the winery is operated by third-generation vintner Thomas Qualia. A cultural melting pot, Del Rio is home to a mix of ethnic and racial backgrounds including Hispanic, African American Seminole, Mestizo, and Tejano. Del Rio offers a variety of Southwestern cuisine including: Tex-Mex, Steakhouses, Barbecue, Authentic Mexican food and "Pan Dulce" or Mexican pastries.

The Upstagers have been performing award-winning live theater in Del Rio since 1977.

The Casa de la Cultura is a non-profit organization that provides community focused outlets for the youth and adults in Del Rio for over 40 years. It offers a revolving variety of classes based on the educational and cultural needs of the community, such as: Ballet Folklorico, Guitar, Singing, Knitting, Pottery, Art Camps, Latino Aerobics and Literacy classes. In the early 2000s, the Casa de la Cultura began Noches Musicales, a live summer music festival with food vendors and live music. The Casa de la Cultura celebrated their 14th annual Live Music Festival in June 2021.

The Del Rio Council for the Arts provides affordable arts and education and entertainment to the community and its surrounding areas. 

Del Rio is home to the George Paul Memorial Bullriding, which is the oldest stand-alone bull-riding event in the world.

Some of the most notable celebrations in the community include: the Independence Day City-Wide Celebration, Cinco de Mayo, 16 de Septiembre, Fiesta de Amistad, and the Fiesta of Flight Air Show. Del Rio held its first ever Pride event in June 2019.

Del Rio is home to consulates of Guatemala and Mexico.

The area is home to various religious profiles including: Christian, Baptist, Catholic, Episcopal, Evangelical, Lutheran, Methodist, Non-Denominational, Pentecostal, Presbyterian, Spirit-Filled, Judaism, Seventh Day Adventist, and many more.

Education
The city is served by the San Felipe Del Rio Consolidated Independent School District. About 10,450 students are enrolled and 637 teachers are employed at 14 campuses throughout the district. Del Rio is also home to Del Rio Heritage Academy High School, and Premier High School, two charter schools.

Higher education
Two four year universities have campuses in Del Rio: Sul Ross State University and Park University.

Southwest Texas Junior College, a two-year community college, has a campus in Del Rio.

Media

Print 
The Del Rio News-Herald was a daily newspaper published in Del Rio, covering Val Verde County, was owned by Southern Newspapers Inc. The newspaper had a daily circulation of 10,400 and a Sunday circulation of 13,500. The newspaper closed in November 2020.

In 2020, The 830 Times, a local news sit covering Del Río and the wider region of southwest Texas is published weekly, launched its print and online newspaper.

Radio 
There are multiple radio stations licensed to the area in and around Del Rio including, KDLK-FM, KTDR, KVFE, KWMC, KDRN, KTPD, KDLI.

In 2014, KVFE, a Christian station owned by Inspiracom, was launched to fill one of the ministry's remaining gaps on the US–Mexico border.

In 2016, Texas Public Radio opened a transmitter in Del Rio.

Digital 
In 2020, The 830 Times, a local news site covering Del Rio and the wider region of southwest Texas, launched.

Infrastructure

Transportation
Del Rio International Airport (FlyDRT) serves the city and surrounding area. American Airlines operates flights twice daily between Del Rio and Dallas/Fort Worth International Airport. The route is currently served by regional affiliate SkyWest Airlines on their 65-seat Canadair CRJ 700 series aircraft. On January 5, 2023, the City of Del Rio announced that American Airlines will terminate service to DRT effective April 3rd, 2023, leaving Del Rio without scheduled air carrier service.

Transportation services to the citizens of Del Rio is provided by the City of Del Río Transportation Department.

Amtrak provides passenger rail service to Del Rio station through its combined Sunset Limited/Texas Eagle service. Trains serve the station thrice-weekly in each direction, with direct service to Los Angeles, San Antonio, New Orleans, Chicago, and points in between.

Major highways
 U.S. Route 90 connects with Alpine, Marfa, and El Paso to the west, Uvalde and San Antonio to the east.
 U.S. Route 277 connects with San Angelo to the north and Crystal City and Laredo (by U.S. Route 83) to the southeast.
 U.S. Route 377 crosses sparsely populated West Texas through several small towns before eventually reaching Fort Worth.
 Texas State Highway Loop 79 in Val Verde County and Del Rio, known as a Super Two Loop, opened for traffic in mid-May 2012. It connects with U.S. Route 90, U.S. Route 277, and U.S. Route 377; Loop 79 is part of the Ports to Plain Corridor Infrastructure and the future Interstate 27 that extends from Laredo to Denver, Colorado.

Notable people
 Jessica Alba (born 1981), actress, was a resident when her father was stationed at Laughlin AFB
 Consuelo González Amezcua (1903–1975), outsider artist and poet
 Lance Blanks (born 1966), retired NBA player, was drafted in the first round of the 1990 NBA draft by the Detroit Pistons, and was the general manager of the NBA's Phoenix Suns from 2010 to 2013
 Larvell Blanks (born 1950), MLB infielder for the Atlanta Braves, Cleveland Indians and Texas Rangers
 Sid Blanks (born 1940), halfback for the Houston Oilers and Boston Patriots of the American Football League
 John R. Brinkley (1885–1942), quack doctor and radio pioneer who experimented with goat glands as a means of curing male impotence
 Radney Foster (born 1959), country music singer/songwriter
 Bob Gruber (born 1958), retired offensive tackle in the NFL and USFL
 Todd Hays (born 1969), bobsledder who won the silver medal in the four-man event at the 2002 Winter Olympics in Salt Lake City, Utah
 Cory James (born 1993), NFL football player for the Oakland Raiders and former player for Colorado State University
 Jay Kerr (born 1948), actor who has appeared in various movies and television series, including his role as Con Madigan in the Australian series Five Mile Creek
 Jack Mayfield (born 1990), an American professional baseball infielder for the Los Angeles Angels of Major League Baseball (MLB). Signed as an undrafted free agent after playing college baseball for the Oklahoma Sooners
 Shawn Michaels (born 1965), a professional wrestler, was a resident when his father was stationed at Laughlin Air Force Base
 Evelyn Peirce (1907–1960), actress
 Jerry Edwin Smith (born 1946), judge of the United States Court of Appeals for the Fifth Circuit
 Byron Velvick (born 1964), Bassmasters pro fisherman and reality show contestant on The Bachelor
 Hoke Hayden "Hooks" Warner (1894–1947), MLB player for the Chicago Cubs and Pittsburgh Pirates in the early 20th century

Del Rio in film, television, and music

Del Rio features prominently (though scenes were shot elsewhere) in No Country for Old Men, the 2007 neo-Western thriller film directed, written, and edited by Joel and Ethan Coen, based on the Cormac McCarthy novel of the same name.

Other presentations with a Del Rio setting include:

 1951 Arrowhead – Charlton Heston
 1955 The Last Command – Ernest Borgnine
 1958 Five Bold Women – Irish McCalla
 1960 John Wayne's The Alamo
 1960 The Spirit of the Alamo (TV) – NBC
 1960 The Roy Rogers Show (TV)
 1961 John Ford's – Two Rode Together – Jimmy Stewart
 1966 Top Hand (TV)
 1967 Aye, That Pancho Villa (TV)
 1967 Bandolero – Dean Martin
 1968 Children's West (Lon Chaney, Jr.) (TV)
 1973 A Death in Tombstone
 1974 The Sugarland Express – Goldie Hawn
 1974 The Texas Ballad (KLRN-TV)
 1977 Rolling Thunder (film)
 1978 Adventures of Jody Shanan
 1983 Call to Glory – Craig T. Nelson, Elisabeth Shue (TV)
 1986 Houston: The Legend of Texas (TV) – Sam Elliott
 1986 The Alamo – Thirteen Days To Glory (TV) – Alec Baldwin
 1986 No Safe Haven – Wings Hauser
 1987 Alamo: Price of Freedom – Casey Biggs
 1988 Lonesome Dove (TV) – Robert Duvall
 1989 Gunsmoke – The Last Apache (TV) – James Arness
 1991 JCV Japanese Quiz Show (TV)
 1991 American Movie Classics (TV) – Bob Dorian
 1992 Rio Diablo (TV) – Travis Tritt
 1992 Travis Smith (direct to video)
 1993 Bad Girls – Madeleine Stowe
 1993 Like Water for Chocolate
 1993 El Mariachi, Robert Rodriguez
 1994 8 Seconds – Luke Perry
 1994 Gambler V: Playing for Keeps (TV) – Kenny Rogers
 1994 James A. Michener's Texas (TV) – John Schneider as Davy Crockett
 1995 Good Old Boys (TV) – Sam Shepard
 1995 Streets of Laredo (TV) – James Garner
 1995 A&E History Channel's The Alamo (TV)
 1995 Discovery Channel's – The Battles of the Alamo (TV)
 1995 PBS – Ken Burns The West (TV)
 1995 A&E Biography – Davy Crockett: American Frontier Legend (TV)
 1995 The Learning Channel's – Famous Battles – Alamo Segment (TV)
 1995 Discovery Channel's – Buffalo Soldiers (TV)
 1995 Desperado, Robert Rodriguez, Antonio Banderas, Salma Hayek
 1996 From Dusk till Dawn – Quentin Tarantino
 1996 Once Upon a Time In China and America – Sammo Hung
 1996 Lone Star – by director John Sayles
 1999 Alamo... The New Defenders (direct to video)
 1999 The Bullfighter – Domenica Scorsese
 1999 The History Channel's – Haunted San Antonio (TV)
 2000 Jericho Mark Valley – Leon Coffee – Buck Taylor
 2001 The History Channel's History vs Hollywood (TV)
 2002 Westown Sturghill Productions
 2004 Bandido, Carlos Gallardo, Scott Duncan
 2006 Blue Eyes – Walker Cable Productions
 2006 Mexican Gold – Walker Cable Productions
 2007 The Man Who Came Back – Walker Cable Productions – Eric Braden – Billy Zane
 2007 Friend of The Devil (TV Pilot)
 2007 No Country for Old Men
 2009 Not Forgotten
 2021 We're Here Season 2 – HBO

Music videos
 1995 Brooks and Dunn – "You're Gonna Miss Me When I'm Gone"
 1995 Tim McGraw – "Refried Dreams"
 1996 Gary Hobbs – "Corazón de la Ardiente"
 1996 La Tropa – "The Sheriff"
 1999 Shade of Red – "Revolution"

Neighborhoods
Rincon del Diablo: The section where Barron St. meets Magnolia Street.

Barrio Chihuahua: In the southern part of the city, this neighborhood, named after the Chihuahua Soccer Field, is located between West Gibbs to the north, Texas State Spur 29 to the west, Garfield Ave., West Garfield to the southeast, and S. Ave F to the far east.

Buena Vista: Located near Buena Vista Park. Lake Amistad and North Del Rio are located past the Buena Vista area.

Cienegas Terraces: Outside the city limits, it is home to the "Duck Pond" and various ranches, on the west side of the city.

Eastside: Named by locals after the school on the corner of Bedell & 7th Street, the neighborhood is also home to Star Park. Surrounded by Veterans Boulevard to the west and E. Gibbs to the south, the neighborhood is home to the Val Verde Regional Medical Center.

San Felipe: The original neighborhood in Del Rio, the city originally got its name from it as in "San Felipe del rio", south of Barrio Chihuahua and the Northside. Home of the San Felipe Creek.

Qualia: Home to Val Verde Winery, the oldest operating winery in Texas. Next door to the San Felipe neighborhood. Residents living within the Qualia area reference the neighborhood as "the one by the Winery," Many historical markers are located within the vicinity.

Westside: Home to Del Rio International Airport, the neighborhood is surrounded to the north by W. 15th, 18th, and 17th Streets, to the east by Veterans Blvd., and to the south by W. Gibbs bordering Chihuahua.

Comalia: A neighborhood isolated by the Woodlawn cemetery and a bridge that leads to the U.S.-Mexico border crossing, it can be found by traveling down W. 2nd Street.

Notes

References

External links

 City of Del Rio official website
 Del Rio Chamber of Commerce

 
Cities in Texas
Cities in Val Verde County, Texas
Mexico–United States border crossings
County seats in Texas
Micropolitan areas of Texas
Texas populated places on the Rio Grande